The 2014 BET Hip Hop Awards was held on October 14, 2014 at Atlanta Civic Center in the ATL. The nominations were announced on September 4, 2014. Snoop Dogg returned as the event's host. Canadian rapper Drake leads the nominations with 8 nominations, while Jay-Z, Pharrell and Future follow him with six. DJ Mustard won the most awards with 4 wins, followed by Drake with 3 wins.

Performances
List of the performers were announced on September 18, 2014:
Rae Sremmurd – "No Flex Zone!"
Rich Gang featuring Young Thug, Rich Homie Quan and Birdman – "Lifestyle"
Common featuring Vince Staples and Jay Electronica - "Kingdom"
Migos - "Fight Night" and "Handsome and Wealthy"
DJ Mustard featuring Lil Boosie, Ty Dolla $ign and YG - "Face Down", "Paranoid" and "My Hitta"
Brandy featuring MC Lyte, Yo-Yo and Queen Latifah - "I Wanna Be Down" (Hip Hop Remix)
T.I. featuring Young Thug - "About the Money"
Bobby Shmurda - "Hot Boy"

Cyphers
Pre-Show Cypher: T-Rex, Goodz, Tsu Surf and Rain 910
Cypher 1: Tuki Carter, Berner, Chevy Woods, Ty Dolla $ign, Juicy J and Wiz Khalifa
Cypher 2: Vic Mensa, Snow Tha Product, King Los, Treach and David Banner
Cypher 3: Troy Ave, Detroit Che, Dee-1, Logic and Lil Mama
Cypher 4: Jarren Benton, Corey Charron, Remy Ma and Papoose
Cypher 5: O.T. Genasis, Kevin Gates, G-Eazy and Loaded Lux
Cypher 6: Arsonal, Couture, Calicoe and Murda Mook

Nominations

Best Hip Hop Video 
Drake - "Worst Behavior"
 Future (featuring Pharrell, Pusha T & Casino) - "Move That Doh"
 Iggy Azalea (featuring Charli XCX) - "Fancy"
 J. Cole (featuring TLC) - "Crooked Smile"
 Nicki Minaj - "Pills N Potions"
 Wiz Khalifa - "We Dem Boyz"

Best Collabo, Duo or Group 
YG (featuring Jeezy & Rich Homie Quan) - "My Hitta"
 Eminem (featuring Rihanna) - "The Monster"
 Future (featuring Pharrell, Pusha T & Casino) - "Move That Doh"
 Jay-Z (featuring Justin Timberlake) - "Holy Grail"
 Schoolboy Q (featuring BJ the Chicago Kid) - "Studio"

Best Live Performer 
Kanye West
 Drake
 Jay-Z
 Kendrick Lamar
 T.I.

Lyricist of the Year 
Kendrick Lamar
 Drake
 Eminem
 J. Cole
 Jay-Z
 Nicki Minaj

Hip Hop Video Director  
Hype Williams
 Benny Boom
 Chris Robinson
 Director X
 Dre Films

DJ of the Year 
DJ Mustard
 DJ Drama
 DJ Envy
 DJ Khaled
 DJ Scream

Producer of the Year 
DJ Mustard
 Drumma Boy
 Hit-Boy
 Mike WiLL Made It
 Pharrell
 Timbaland

MVP of the Year 
DJ Mustard
 Drake
 Future
 Jay-Z
 Nicki Minaj

Track of the Year 
Only the producer of the track nominated in this category.
"My Hitta" - Produced by DJ Mustard  (YG featuring Jeezy & Rich Homie Quan)
 "Cut Her Off" (Remix) - Produced by Will-A-Fool  (K Camp featuring Lil Boosie, YG, & Too $hort)
 "Move That Doh" - Produced by Mike WiLL Made It  (Future featuring Pharrell, Pusha T & Casino)
 "Studio" - Produced by Swiff D  (Schoolboy Q featuring BJ the Chicago Kid)
 "Worst Behavior" - Produced by DJ Dahi  (Drake)

Album of the Year 
Drake - Nothing Was the Same
 Eminem - The Marshall Mathers LP 2
 Future - Honest
 Rick Ross - Mastermind
 Schoolboy Q - Oxymoron
 Yo Gotti - I Am

Who Blew Up Award / Rookie of the Year 
Iggy Azalea
 Migos
 Rich Homie Quan
 Schoolboy Q
 YG
 Young Thug

Hustler of the Year 
Dr. Dre
 Drake
 Jay-Z
 Rick Ross
 T.I.

Made-You-Look Award / Best Hip Hop Style 
Nicki Minaj
 A$AP Rocky
 Jay-Z
 Kanye West
 Young Thug

Best Hip Hop Online Site 
WorldStarHipHop.com
 AllHipHop.com
 Complex.com
 HotNewHipHop.com
 NecoleBitchie.com
 RapRadar.com

Best Club Banger 
Future (featuring Pharrell, Pusha T & Casino) - "Move That Doh" (Produced by Mike WiLL Made It)
 K Camp (featuring Lil Boosie, YG, & Too $hort) - "Cut Her Off" (Remix) (Produced by Will-A-Fool)
 Migos - "Fight Night" (Produced by Stack Boy Twaun)
 Wiz Khalifa - "We Dem Boyz" (Produced by Detail)
 YG (featuring Jeezy & Rich Homie Quan) - "My Hitta" (Produced by DJ Mustard)
 Young Thug - "Stoner" (Produced by Dun Deal)

Best Mixtape 
Wiz Khalifa - 28 Grams
 Action Bronson - Blue Chips 2
 Fabolous - The Soul Tape 3
 Migos - No Label 2
 Rich Homie Quan - I Promise I Will Never Stop Going In

Sweet 16 (Best Featured Verse) 
Kendrick Lamar - "Control" (Big Sean featuring Kendrick Lamar & Jay Electronica)
 B.o.B - "Paranoid" (Ty Dolla Sign featuring B.o.B)
 B.o.B - "Up Down (Do This All Day)" (T-Pain featuring B.o.B)
 Drake - "Who Do You Love" (YG featuring Drake)
 Pharrell - "Move That Doh" (Future featuring Pharrell, Pusha T & Casino)

Impact Track 
Common (featuring Vince Staples) - "Kingdom"
 Lecrae - "Nuthin"
 Lupe Fiasco - "Mission"
 The Roots (featuring Patty Cash) - "Never"
 Talib Kweli (featuring Abby Dobson) - "State of Grace"

People's Champ Award 
Drake - "Worst Behavior"
 Future (featuring Pharrell, Pusha T & Casino) - "Move That Doh"
 Iggy Azalea (featuring Charli XCX) - "Fancy"
 Wiz Khalifa - "We Dem Boyz"
 YG (featuring Lil Wayne, Nicki Minaj, Meek Mill & Rich Homie Quan) - "My Hitta (Remix)"

I Am Hip Hop Award 
Doug E. Fresh

References

BET Hip Hop Awards
2014 music awards